The following is a list of software programs that can communicate with and/or host directory services via the Lightweight Directory Access Protocol (LDAP).

Client software

Cross-platform 
 Admin4 - an open source LDAP browser and directory client for Linux, OS X, and Microsoft Windows, implemented in Python.
 Apache Directory Server/Studio - an LDAP browser and directory client for Linux, OS X, and Microsoft Windows, and as a plug-in for the Eclipse development environment.
 FusionDirectory, a web application under license GNU General Public License developed in PHP for managing LDAP directory and associated services.
 JXplorer - a Java-based browser that runs in any operating environment.
 JXWorkBench  - a Java-based plugin to JXplorer that includes LDAP reporting using the JasperReports reporting engine.
 LDAP Account Manager - a PHP based webfrontend for managing various account types in an LDAP directory.
 phpLDAPadmin - a web-based LDAP administration tool for creating and editing LDAP entries in any LDAP server.
  LDAP User Manager - A simple PHP interface to add LDAP users and groups.  Also has a self-service password change feature.  Designed to be run as a Docker container.
 SLAMD - an open source load generation software suite, for testing multiple application protocols, including LDAP. Also contains tools for creating test data and test scripts.
 RoundCube - an open source and free PHP IMAP client with support with LDAP based address books.
 GOsa² - provides a powerful framework for managing accounts and systems in LDAP databases
 web2ldap, a web application under license Apache License 2.0 developed in Python for managing LDAP directories.
 OpenDJ - a Java-based LDAP server and directory client that runs in any operating environment, under license CDDL
 LDAP Explorer - a VS Code extension to browse LDAP servers

Linux/UNIX 
 Evolution - the contacts part of GNOME's PIM can query LDAP servers.
 KAddressBook - the address book application for KDE, capable of querying LDAP servers.
 OpenLDAP - a free, open source implementation.
 diradm / diradm-2 - A nearly complete nss/shadow suite for managing POSIX users/groups/data in LDAP.
 System Security Services Daemon (SSSD) - a system service to access remote directories and authentication mechanisms

Mac OS X 
 Contacts - an LDAP-aware address book application built into Mac OS X.
 Directory Utility - a utility for configuring access to several types of directory servers, including LDAP; built into Mac OS X.
 Workgroup Manager - a utility for configuring access to several types of directory servers, including LDAP; built into Mac OS X Server and one of Apple's Server Admin Tools.
 Slapd - from the Univ of Michigan

Microsoft Windows 
Active Directory Explorer - a freeware LDAP client tool from Microsoft
 LDAP Admin - a free, open source LDAP directory browser and editor
 Ldp is an LDAP client included with Microsoft Windows
 NetTools - is a freeware utility for AD troubleshooting and includes an LDAP client
 ActivMann- is a freeware utility for managing users and groups in Active Directory

Middleware 
 Json2Ldap - a JSON-RPC-to-LDAP gateway

Server software

Notes

References 

Directory services
Lists of software